2296 Kugultinov, provisional designation , is a carbonaceous Themistian asteroid from the outer region of the asteroid belt, approximately 20 kilometers in diameter.

It was discovered on 18 January 1975, by Russian astronomer Lyudmila Chernykh at the Crimean Astrophysical Observatory on the Crimean peninsula in Nauchnyj, and named after Soviet poet David Nikitich Kugultinov.

Classification and orbit 

Kugultinov is a carbonaceous C-type asteroid and member of the Themis family, a dynamical family of outer-belt asteroids with nearly coplanar ecliptical orbits. It orbits the Sun in the outer main-belt at a distance of 2.7–3.7 AU once every 5 years and 8 months (2,073 days). Its orbit has an eccentricity of 0.17 and an inclination of 1° with respect to the ecliptic.

Physical characteristics

Diameter and albedo 

According to the surveys carried out by the NEOWISE mission of NASA's Wide-field Infrared Survey Explorer and the Japanese Akari satellite, Kugultinov measures between 15.10 and 21.566 kilometers in diameter and its surface has an albedo between 0.083 and 0.12. The Collaborative Asteroid Lightcurve Link (CALL) assumes an albedo of 0.08 and calculates a diameter of 20.51 kilometers based an absolute magnitude of 11.8.

Lightcurves 

Three different rotational lightcurves of Kugultinov were obtain from photometric observations. The first, fragmentary lightcurve by Roberto Crippa and Federico Manzini in December 2013, gave a rotation period of 10 hours with a brightness variation of  magnitude. CALL considers the shorter period solution the better result.

Naming 

This minor planet was named after David Nikitich Kugultinov (1922–2006), prominent Soviet poet and national poet of the Republic of Kalmykia (also see 2287 Kalmykia). The approved naming citation was published by the Minor Planet Center on 2 December 1990.

Notes

References

External links 
 Asteroid Lightcurve Database (LCDB), query form (info )
 Dictionary of Minor Planet Names, Google books
 Asteroids and comets rotation curves, CdR – Observatoire de Genève, Raoul Behrend
 Discovery Circumstances: Numbered Minor Planets (1)-(5000) – Minor Planet Center
 
 

002296
Discoveries by Lyudmila Chernykh
Named minor planets
19750118